Annie is the sixth studio album by Anne Murray issued in 1972 on Capitol Records. It peaked at number 14 on the Billboard Country Albums chart and number 143 on the Billboard Pop Albums chart. The album title was inspired by her pet name. It won the Best Produced MOR Album for Brian Ahern who also arranged the album. The front cover was credited to Dean Torrence of Jan & Dean fame.

Track listing
 "Robbie's Song for Jesus" (Robbie MacNeill) - 2:37
 "Falling Into Rhyme" (Maribeth Solomon) - 3:02
 "I Like Your Music" (Sonny Curtis) - 2:35
 "Everything Has Got to Be Free" (Bodie Chandler) - 2:39
 "Drown Me" (Peter Cornell) - 2:50
 "You Can't Have a Hand on Me" (Billy Gale) - 3:05
 "You Made My Life a Song" (Sonny Curtis) - 2:17
 "You Can't Go Back" (Paul Grady) - 2:23
 "Beautiful" (Carole King) - 3:03
 "Everything's Been Changed" (Paul Anka) - 4:03

Personnel
Anne Murray - vocals
Andy Cree, Bill Speer, Brent Titcomb, Brian Ahern, Don Thompson, Skip Beckwith - musicians
Technical
Brian Ahern, Chris Skene, Ian Goggin, Miles Wilkinson - engineer
Dean Torrence - front cover

References

1972 albums
Anne Murray albums
Albums produced by Brian Ahern (producer)
Capitol Records albums